The 1994 Tooheys 1000 was a motor race held on 2 October 1994 at the Mount Panorama Circuit near Bathurst in New South Wales, Australia. It was the 35th running of the Bathurst 1000 touring car race. The race was open to cars complying with CAMS Group 3A Touring Car regulations, later known as V8 Supercars and those complying with FIA Class II Touring Car regulations, later known as Super Touring cars. In the lead up to the 2003 event, Wheels Magazine voted the 1994 Bathurst 1000 to be the greatest of all time.

The race was won by Dick Johnson and John Bowe in their Dick Johnson Racing entered Ford EB Falcon, with the latter driver holding off a late-race challenge from then-rookie Craig Lowndes in a Holden Racing Team entered VP Commodore he shared with Brad Jones, which eventually finished second. Larry Perkins and Gregg Hansford were third in their Holden VP Commodore entered by Perkins Engineering.

Entry list

Entry list at the start of Practice One. Kevin Heffernan was entered in Car #50 but moved across to Car #44 prior to the race.

Class A
For 5.0 litre cars, later to become known as V8 Supercars, it consisted of V8 engined Ford Falcons and Holden Commodores.

Class B
For 2.0 litre cars, later to become known as Super Touring cars, it consisted of BMW 318i, Hyundai Lantra, Peugeot 405, Toyota Carina, Toyota Corolla, a modified DTM Mercedes-Benz 190E and older modified Group A BMW M3s and Ford Sierras.

Results

Top 10 shootout
The Tooheys Top Ten was restricted to the top ten cars from Qualifying. The results of this runoff determined the first ten places on the grid for the race. Additional prize money was paid to all entries in the Tooheys Top Ten.

* Glenn Seton took his first ever pole position at Bathurst in his Ford EB Falcon. It was also the first Ford V8 on pole at Bathurst since Allan Moffat put his XB Falcon on pole in 1976. All other Ford pole positions since then (1987, 1988, 1989, 1990 and 1992) had been achieved in the turbocharged 4 cyl Ford Sierra RS500.* After having an earlier time disallowed in qualifying due to a technical infringement, Peter Brock, in his first race at Bathurst for a factory backed Holden team since 1986, then qualified 6th in his Holden Racing Team VP Commodore. He improved in the shootout to qualify second for his first front row start since claiming pole position in a Ford Sierra RS500 in 1989.* Dick Johnson qualified for his 17th straight Top Ten runoff having been the only driver to compete in every one since its inception in 1978. After qualifying 3rd, Johnson fell to 10th after the shootout when he ran wide and hit the wall coming out of The Cutting causing large amounts of tyre smoke from the right rear for the rest of the lap, though his time was only 1/10th slower than the HRT Commodore of Brad Jones.* 1986 and 1990 race winner Allan Grice, who missed the race in 1993, made his first start at Bathurst in a Ford after 19 starts for Holden (1973-1992) and one start in a Fiat 124 Sport in 1968. He qualified his Dick Johnson Racing EB Falcon in 7th in the shootout, faster than team leader Dick Johnson who ended up 10th.* Tony Longhurst and Brad Jones both equalled the record for driving different makes of cars in the Top Ten shootout. Longhurst had previously qualified for Ford (1988-1990) and BMW (1992), while Jones had previously qualified in a Mitsubishi (1986) and a Ford (1989). Both qualified their respective Holden VP Commodores for the 1994 Tooheys Top Ten. The record had been held solely by 1976 race winner Bob Morris who had qualified in the Top Ten for Holden (1978, 1979, 1983), Ford (1980, 1981, 1982) and Mazda (1984).

Race

Notes:
 - Don Watson was killed in an accident at the Chase during Thursday qualifying, which resulted in his entry being withdrawn from the race.
 - Greg Easton's car was badly damaged after an accident during Friday qualifying, and was subsequently withdrawn. Co-driver Kevin Heffernan was later moved into the #44 Holden Commodore VL SS Group A SV of Mike Conway & George Ayoub.

Statistics
 Provisional Pole Position - #1 Glenn Seton - 2:12.0290
 Pole Position - #1 Glenn Seton - 2:12.1464
 Fastest Lap - #17 Dick Johnson - 2:14.1458 - Lap 108
 Winners' Race Time - 7:03:45.8425
 Winners' Average Speed - 142.63 km/h

See also
1994 Australian Touring Car season

References

External links
 Official V8 Supercar website
 Race results, www.uniquecarsandparts.com.au

Motorsport in Bathurst, New South Wales
Tooheys 1000